Allens Corner may refer to:

Allens Corners, Illinois, U.S.
Allens Corner, New Jersey, U.S.
Allens Corner, Ontario, Canada

See also
 Aldens Corners, Wisconsin, U.S.
 Allans Corners, Ontario, Canada